Honke Yatsuhashi Nishio Co., Ltd (本家八ッ橋西尾株式会社 ほんけにしおやつはしかぶしきがいしゃ honke yatsuhashi nishio kabushiki-gaisha) is a manufacturer and seller of the wagashi Yatsuhashi, with more than 300 years of history. Its headquarters are located in the Sakyō-ku ward of Kyoto.

History 
The company was first founded in the year 1689. The name “Yatsuhashi”, meaning "eight bridges", originates from the tale of "The Incident at the Eight Bridges of Mikawa" (三河国八つ橋の事故). Notably, in the year 1900 the company won silver medal at the Paris Exposition. As a corporation, it was established in 1953.

Present Day 
Currently the company is managed by its 14th generation president, Ms. Yoko Nishio and has 16 stores around Kyoto, employing a total of 70 workers. Along with the traditional flavors, this brand offers a variety of options, such as black sesame, matcha, chocobanana (chocolate-covered frozen banana), peach, mango and others.

Additionally, there are other companies that produce and commercialize Yatsuhashi sweets, making similar claims regarding the founding year and origin of this traditional confectionery. Notable examples are Bijū, Izutsu Yatsuhashi Honpo and Shogoin Yatsuhashi Sohonten.

External links 

 Honke Nishio Yatsuhashi Japanese website

References 

Retail companies of Japan
Companies based in Kyoto